Wanstead and Woodford Guardian, now known as Your Local Guardian as a result of a rebranding, is a local newspaper sold every Thursday in the London Borough of Redbridge.

The paper was part of the Guardian Series of local newspapers, which also included the Chingford Guardian, the Waltham Forest Guardian, and the Epping Forest Guardian.

In September 2018 the newspaper was rebranded as Your Local Guardian, the result of a merger between the Chingford, Wanstead and Woodford and Waltham Forest editions.

The paper is published by Newsquest, which prints dozens of local and regional papers across the UK.

The newspaper's weekly circulation is 1,405 copies, according to ABC figures from July to December 2017.

Editors 
 Amanda Patterson (group editor) 2007 - 2012 
 Anthony Longden (editorial director) 2008 - 2012
 Tim Jones (group editor) 2012 - 2017
 Victoria Birch (group editor) 2017–present

References

External links
The Wanstead and Woodford Guardian's website

London newspapers